Tor Lundvall (born 1968 in Wyckoff, New Jersey) is a painter and musician who is based out of East Hampton, New York.

Art
Lundvall has a B.A. in studio art with a minor in literature from the American University in Washington D.C. (1991). His oil paintings are quite vivid and luminous due to his use of vibrant colors and the strong tension created between light and shadow. Lundvall's imagery is mostly inspired by rural northeastern American landscapes which he inhabits with imaginative figures and isolated individuals.  His canvases often depict serene environments with an underlying sense of menace.

Tor first came into the public eye in the early 1990s through his art exhibitions in New York and after creating the CD artwork for various musicians, including several projects for Tony Wakeford's dark folk group Sol Invictus (band).

Lundvall has also produced cover art for Gonzalo Rubalcaba's "Solo" CD (2006) and Miles Davis's "The Blue Note and Capitol Recordings" CD box-set reissue (1993), both released on Blue Note Records. His paintings have also been featured on the covers of the March 2007 and July 2008 issues of Asimov's Science Fiction Magazine.

Music 
A resident of Wyckoff, New Jersey, Lundvall is also a musician, and his compositions are often described as Dark ambient. His first album, "Passing Through Alone" (1997) was co-produced with his brother Kurt Lundvall and could be categorized in the Industrial music genre, as it shared little in common musically with subsequent releases. At the time "Passing Through Alone" was only available at Lundvall's gallery showings, but is now available again through his website.

Lundvall's music came to prominence with the release of "Autumn Calls" (1998), a collaboration with Tony Wakeford released on the now defunct British record label World Serpent Distribution. Three solo albums followed, continuing the seasons-themed concept: "Ice" (1999), "The Mist" (2001) and "Under the Shadows of Trees" (2003).

After the demise of World Serpent in 2004, Tor Lundvall released his recordings through the American label Strange Fortune until November 2008. His major releases for Strange Fortune included "Last Light" (2004), "Empty City" (2006) and the "Yule" EP (2006). "Empty City" featured Lundvall's first attempt at an instrumental approach for an entire album. In 2009, Tor began working with another American label Dais Records, which released his albums "Sleeping and Hiding" (2009), "The Shipyard" (2012) and "The Park" (2015) in vinyl format. Dais Records also released three CD box sets by Lundvall, "The Seasons Unfold" (2011), "Structures and Solitude" (2013) and "Nature Laughs As Time Slips By (2016). All of Tor Lundvall's recordings are mastered by his brother Kurt Lundvall.

Tor Lundvall's music has evolved over the years from early pop songs, to a more ambient sound, which he personally finds difficult to describe or categorize.

"I suppose one could call it 'ghost ambient'! I approach my music in a visual way, starting with a very basic idea and slowly building on it. The tracks are essentially paintings with music and their titles usually reflect the contents. I have also gained a new respect for the piano over the past several years, which plays a major part in my recordings. Although I tend to use electronics and samplers, I always approach music in a natural, organic way. All samples are created at home, usually in the bedroom. I loathe patch presets and use them only rarely. In fact the process of recording is so complex, that the 'equipment used' section printed in my CD booklets is basically useless.
I find that my recent recordings are becoming progressively more instrumental and ambient in nature, although the music still retains a strong sense of melody. As with my paintings, my music has always existed in a private world of its own."

Discography

Albums / Singles / EPs

Compilation Tracks

References

External links
Tor Lundvall's Official Website
Tor Lundvall's Discogs Page

20th-century American painters
American male painters
21st-century American painters
Ambient musicians
Living people
1968 births
American University alumni
People from Wyckoff, New Jersey
Dais Records artists
20th-century American male artists